The 1997 Clásica de San Sebastián was the 17th edition of the Clásica de San Sebastián cycle race and was held on 9 August 1997. The race started and finished in San Sebastián. The race was won by Davide Rebellin of the Française des Jeux team.

General classification

References

Clásica de San Sebastián
San
Clasica De San Sebastian
August 1997 sports events in Europe